Blonde stereotypes are stereotypes of blonde-haired people. Sub-types of this stereotype include the "blonde bombshell" and the "dumb blonde". Blondes are stereotyped as more desirable, but less intelligent than brunettes. There are many blonde jokes made on these premises.

The blonde bombshell is one of the most notable and consistently popular female character types in cinema. Many showbiz stars have used it to their advantage, including Jean Harlow, Marlene Dietrich, Marilyn Monroe, Jayne Mansfield, Brigitte Bardot and Mamie Van Doren.

Background
There are several aspects to the stereotypical perception of blonde-haired women. On one hand, over history, blonde hair in women has often been considered attractive and desirable. Blonde hair has been considered attractive for long periods of time in various European cultures, particularly when coupled with blue eyes. This perception is exploited in culture and advertising.

In contemporary popular culture, it is often stereotyped that men find blonde women more attractive than women with other hair colors. For example, Anita Loos popularized this idea in her 1925 novel Gentlemen Prefer Blondes. Blondes are often assumed to have more fun; for example, in a Clairol commercial for hair colorant, they use the phrase "Is it true blondes have more fun?" Some women have reported they feel other people expect them to be more fun-loving after having lightened their hair. In much of the Americas, the blonde stereotype is associated with being less serious or less intelligent. However, an analysis of IQ data carried out by the National Longitudinal Surveys on a survey database of American "baby boomers" (NLSY79 data), the natural blonde women in this population category (excluding  African American and Hispanic persons) have a slightly higher mean IQ than brunettes, black and red-haired women.

On the other hand, a blonde woman is often perceived as making little use of intelligence and as a "woman who relies on her looks rather than on intelligence." At the same time, people tend to presume that blondes are less serious-minded and less intelligent than brunettes, as reflected in "blonde jokes". The root of this notion may be traced to Europe, with the "dumb blonde" in question being a French courtesan named Rosalie Duthé, satirised in a 1775 play Les Curiosités de la Foire for her habit of pausing a long time before speaking, appearing not only stupid but literally dumb (meaning mute). The latter stereotype of "dumb blonde" is exploited in blonde jokes. In Brazil, this extends to blonde women being disparaged, as reflected in sexist jokes, as sexually licentious.

Alfred Hitchcock preferred to cast blonde women for major roles in his films as he believed that the audience would suspect them the least, comparing them to "virgin snow that shows up the bloody footprints", hence the term "Hitchcock blonde". This stereotype became so ingrained that it spawned counter-narratives, such as in the 2001 film Legally Blonde, in which Reese Witherspoon succeeds at Harvard Law School despite biases against her beauty and blonde hair, and terms such as cookie-cutter blonde (CCB), implying standardized blonde looks and standard perceived social and intelligence characteristics of a blonde. Many actors and actresses in Latin America and Hispanic United States have blonde hair and blue eyes and/or pale skin, such as Christina Aguilera and Shakira.

Typology

Annette Kuhn divides blonde stereotypes in cinema into three categories in The Women's Companion to International Film:
 The "ice-cold blonde": Kuhn defined it as "a blonde who hides a fire beneath an exterior of coldness". She provided Grace Kelly, Veronica Lake, Kim Novak, Mae Murray, and Eva Marie Saint as examples.
 The "blonde bombshell": Kuhn defined it as "a blonde with explosive sexuality and is available to men at a price". She provided Brigitte Bardot, Lana Turner, Jean Harlow, Joan Blondell, Mae West, Barbara Eden, Marilyn Monroe, and Diana Dors as examples.
 The "dumb blonde": Kuhn defined it as "a blonde with an overt and natural sexuality and a profound manifestation of ignorance". She provided Jayne Mansfield, Marion Davies, Alice White, Marie Wilson, and Mamie Van Doren as examples.

In cognitive linguistics, the stereotype uses expressivity of words to affect an emotional response which determines a gender role of a certain kind. In feminist critique, stereotypes like the blonde bombshell or the "dumb blonde" are seen as negative images that undermine the power of women.

Blonde bombshell

The blonde bombshell is a gender stereotype that connotes a very attractive woman with blonde hair. A review of English language tabloids from the United Kingdom has shown it to be a recurring blonde stereotype, along with "busty blonde" and "blonde babe".

Jean Harlow started the stereotype with her film Bombshell of 1933. Following her, Marilyn Monroe, Jayne Mansfield and Mamie Van Doren helped establish the stereotype typified by a combination of curvaceous physique, very light-colored hair and a perceived lack of intelligence. During the 1950s, the blonde bombshell started to replace the Femme fatale as the mainstream media stereotype. Marjorie Rosen, a historian of women in films, says of the two top blonde bombshells of the time that "Mae West, firing off vocal salvos with imperious self-assurance, and Jean Harlow, merchandising her physical allure for the masses, transformed the idea of passive female sexuality into an aggressive statement of fact".

Dumb blonde

The notion of "dumb blonde" has been a topic of academic research reported in scholarly articles and university symposia, which tend to confirm that many people hold to the perception that light-haired women are less intelligent than women with dark hair. While there is no evidence that suggests that blondes are less intelligent than other people, it has been suggested that the state of being blonde creates opportunities that do not require investing in education and training. It is believed the first recorded "dumb blonde" was an 18th-century blonde French courtesan named Rosalie Duthé whose reputation of being beautiful and dumb, even in the literal sense of not talking much, inspired a play about her called Les Curiosités de la Foire (Paris 1775).

A possible explanation is that attractive women have less pressing incentives to cultivate and demonstrate their intellect to ensure their future, since attractiveness is an asset, or correlatively that intelligent women have less pressing incentives to dye their hair to a presumed attractive color. The validity of this explanation is corroborated by its applicability to a similar pervasiveness of the "dumb athlete" stereotype. The dumb blonde stereotype (and the associated cognitive bias) may have some negative consequences and it can also damage a blonde person's career prospects.

Gentlemen Prefer Blondes (1925) by Anita Loos originated as a comic novel and explores the appeal of blonde women. It spawned a musical on Broadway, and two films released in 1928 and 1953. The Encyclopedia of Hair describes Marilyn Monroe's blonde role in the second film as that of "a fragile woman who relied on her looks rather than on intelligence—what some people refer to as 'dumb blonde'." At the same time, in the film she demonstrates a certain amount of wit regarding her life position expressed in the song "Diamonds Are a Girl's Best Friend". Madonna emulated that screen-persona of Monroe in her music video Material Girl.

Many blonde actresses have played stereotypical "dumb blondes", including Monroe (dyed blonde), Judy Holliday, Jayne Mansfield (dyed blonde), Carol Wayne and Goldie Hawn. Goldie Hawn is best known as the giggling "dumb blonde", stumbling over her lines, especially when she introduced Rowan & Martin's Laugh-In "News of the Future". In the American sitcom Three's Company the blonde girl (originally Chrissy, played by Suzanne Somers, and later Cindy and Terri) is sweet and naïve, while the brunette (Janet, played by Joyce DeWitt) is smart.

Country music star Dolly Parton who recorded a song called "Dumb Blonde", famously said that dumb blonde jokes about her do not offend her because, "I know I am not dumb, and I am not blonde."

Blonde jokes

There is a category of jokes called "blonde jokes" that employs the dumb blonde stereotype. It overlaps at times with other jokes that portray the subject of the joke as promiscuous and/or stupid. Some blonde jokes rely on sexual humour to portray or stereotype their subjects as promiscuous. Many of these are rephrased sorority girl or Essex girl jokes, much as other jokes about dumb blondes are based on long-running ethnic jokes. Many of these jokes are mere variants on traditional ethnic jokes or jests about other identifiable groups (such as Italian jokes involving Carabinieri, Sardarji jokes or Pathan jokes). Similar jokes about stereotyped minorities have circulated since the seventeenth century with only the wording and targeted groups changed.

Blonde jokes have been criticized as sexist by several authors, as most blondes in these jokes are female, although male variations also exist. In fact, dumb blonde jokes are overwhelmingly female-specific: according to an extensive search in various publications and on the Internet, about 63% of dumb blonde jokes are directed exclusively at females (compared to less than 5% that directly referenced dumb blond men). Research indicates that because of this, men report being amused by blonde jokes significantly more than women do. The fact that most of these jokes target the invariably dim-witted, and sexually promiscuous, female makes them even more sexist. In the 20th century, a class of meta-jokes about blondes (i.e. jokes about blonde jokes) has emerged. In a typical plot of this type, a blonde complains about the unfairness of the stereotype propagated by blonde jokes, with a punch line actually reinforcing the stereotype.

Blondes versus brunettes

In a 16 November 2011 article titled "Blondes vs. Brunettes: TV Shows with Betty and Veronica-Style Love Triangles", media critic Tucker Cummings cited several TV shows that featured a "classic war between blonde and brunette love interests", including The Office (where lighter haired Pam Beesly competes with brunette Karen Filipelli for the attention of Jim Halpert), Suits (where blonde Jenny Griffith competes with brunette Rachel Zane for the attention of Mike Ross), and Dexter (where blonde Rita Bennent and brunette Lila West compete for the affections of Dexter Morgan, the main character). Typically, she wrote, "... the blonde (is) stable, and typifies the 'girl next door,' while (the) ... brunette, is haughty, and a bit more exotic." In Archie comics, Betty Cooper and Veronica Lodge have been engaged in a mostly friendly competition for over 70 years.

A number of studies have been conducted over the years to measure society's attitude toward blondes and brunettes. Some studies have shown that men, mainly those of Caucasian descent, find blonde women more attractive than brunettes, redheads, or women of other races who had darker hair, eyes, or complexion. Other studies, however, have shown that more men find brunettes more attractive, due to geographic location, familiarity and perceived emotional and cultural connection. 
 A Cornell University study showed that blonde waitresses receive larger tips than brunettes, even when controlling for other variables such as age, breast size, height and weight.

In a 2012 interview with NBC News, Lisa Walker, Sociology Department Chair at the University of North Carolina said that hair color "absolutely" plays a role in the way people are treated and claimed that numerous studies had shown that blonde women were paid higher salaries than other women. In a study by Diana J. Kyle and Heike I. M. Mahler (1996), the researchers asked subjects to evaluate photographs of the same woman with "natural" (not dyed) looking brown, red, and blonde hair in the context of a job application for an accounting position. The researchers found that the blonde-haired applicant was rated as significantly less capable than her brunette counterpart. In addition, participants designated the female applicant's starting salary as significantly lower when she was depicted as a blonde than when she was shown with brown hair.

A study that looked at the CEOs of the Financial Times Stock Exchange's (FTSE) top 500 companies investigated how hair color could be a potential barrier to professional success. In another study by Brian Bates, two sets of MBA graduates were given the same Curriculum vitae of the same women split between two sets of attached photos - blonde and brunette. The brunette was considered more for a managerial position and for a higher salary. A 2011 University of Westminster study evaluated how men perceived women who entered a London nightclub as a blonde or a brunette. The study, published in the Scandinavian Journal of Psychology, used the same woman and had her dye her hair a different color for each visit. The results showed that, as a blonde, she was more likely to be approached for conversation than as a brunette. However, when the researchers interviewed the men who spoke to her, the men rated her more intelligent and attractive as a brunette than as a blonde.

French magazine Le Monde believes that the rivalry is more prevalent in the United States. In a 2012 article, Le Monde argued that American TV has almost, without exception, characterized blonde women as having the positive values of purity, goodness, and sincerity, frequently at the expense of their brunette counterparts. The article provided several examples including Bewitched (where Samantha, the blonde witch, displays a sense of tolerance while her dark-haired cousin Serena plays the wild one), Dynasty (where blonde Krystal pitted against brunette Alexis), and V (in both the original series in 1984 and the remake in 2009 shows an intelligent, humanistic blonde battling a brunette leader of the alien cannibals).

In Russia, according to a 2011 survey by the Southern Federal University, brunettes are considered more attractive than blondes. It is important to note that among the respondents in this study were 50% men and 50% women.

One theory forwards, as an explanation, the concept of the feminization of blond hair, which can be seen by the overwhelming association of the dumb blond persona with females. This idea draws on the stereotype that females have a lower psychometric intelligence than males.

Counter representation
At the same time, there are many examples where the stereotype is exploited only to combat it. The film Legally Blonde starring Reese Witherspoon featured the stereotype as a centrepiece of its plot. However, the protagonist turns out to be very intelligent and is shown to have been underachieving due to society's low expectations of her.

Country music entertainer Dolly Parton, aware of this occasional characterization of her, addressed it in her 1967 hit "Dumb Blonde". Parton's lyrics challenged the stereotype, stating "just because I'm blonde, don't think I'm dumb 'cause this dumb blonde ain't nobody's fool". Parton has said she was not offended by "all the dumb-blonde jokes because I know I'm not dumb. I'm also not blonde."

The author of the comic strip Blondie, Chic Young, starting with "Dumb Dora", gradually transformed the titular character into a smart, hard-working, family-oriented woman.

In The Simpsons episode "To Surveil with Love" Lisa faces prejudice with her brunette peers because of her blonde hair. She dyes her hair dark brown to prove her point that not all blondes are dumb, and that people need to look past stereotypes.

See also
 Prejudice and discrimination against redheads

References

Sources
 Encyclopedia of Hair: a Cultural History, by Victoria Sherrow, Greenwood Publishing Group, 2006, 
 

Female stock characters
Joke cycles
Stereotypes of white women
Stereotype